Harald Kleinschmidt (born 1 June 1949) is a German historian and scholar of international relations. He completed his doctorate in philosophy at the University of Göttingen.

Kleinschmidt is currently a professor of history at the University of Tsukuba.

Bibliography 

Some of Kleinschmidt's books include:
 Charles V: The World Emperor
 Nemesis of Power: A History of International Relations Theories
 Migration, Regional Integration and Human Security: The Formation and Maintenance of Transnational Spaces
 Perception and Action in Medieval Europe

References

External links
 

20th-century German historians
German male writers
1949 births
Living people
21st-century German historians
Academic staff of the University of Tsukuba